Hypophosphoric acid is a mineral acid with the formula H4P2O6, with phosphorus in a formal oxidation state of +4. In the solid state it is present as the dihydrate, H4P2O6·2H2O. In hypophosphoric acid the phosphorus atoms are identical and joined directly with a P−P bond. Isohypophosphoric acid is a structural isomer of hypophosphoric acid in which one phosphorus has a hydrogen directedly bonded to it and that phosphorus atom is linked to the other one by an oxygen bridge to give a phosphorous acid/phosphoric acid mixed anhydride. The two phosphorus atoms are in the +3 and +5 oxidation states, respectively.

Preparation and reactions
Hypophosphoric acid can be prepared by the reaction of red phosphorus with sodium chlorite at room temperature.
2 P + 2 NaClO2 + 2 H2O → Na2H2P2O6 + 2 HCl

A mixture of hypophosphoric acid, phosphorous acid (H3PO3) and phosphoric acid (H3PO4) is produced when white phosphorus oxidises in air when partially immersed in water.

The tetrasodium salt Na4P2O6·10H2O crystallises at pH 10 and the disodium salt, Na2H2PO6·6H2O at pH 5.2. The disodium salt can be passed through an ion exchange column to form the acid dihydrate, H4P2O6·2H2O.

The anhydrous acid can be formed by vacuum dehydration over P4O10 or by the reaction of H2S on lead hypophosphate, Pb2P2O6.

Hypophosphoric acid is tetraprotic with dissociation constants pKa1 = 2.2, pKa2 = 2.8, pKa3 = 7.3 and pKa4 = 10.0.

On standing the anhydrous acid undergoes rearrangement and disproportionation to form a mixture of isohypophosphoric acid, HPO(OH)-O-PO2(OH); pyrophosphoric acid H2P2O7 and pyrophosphorous acid.

Hypophosphoric acid is unstable in hot hydrochloric acid, in 4 M HCl it hydrolyses to give H3PO3 + H3PO4.

Structure
Hypophosphorus acid contains oxonium ions and is best formulated [H3O+]2 [H2P2O6]2−. The acid is isostructural with the diammonium salt which contains the [HOPO2PO2OH]2− anion with a P−P bond length of 219 pm.

The HOPO2PO2OH2− anion in Na2H2P2O6·6H2O has a symmetric, staggered ethane-like structure with a P−P bond of length 219 pm. Each phosphorus atom has two P−O bonds with length 151 pm, and a P−OH bond length of 159 pm.

Hypophosphate salts
Many hypophosphate salts are known, for example, K4P2O6·8H2O, Ca2P2O6·2H2O, K3HP2O6·3H2O, K2H2P2O6·2H2O, KH3P2O6.

On standing in air, hypophosphates tend to oxidise to pyrophosphates containing the  ion where P has a formal oxidation state of +5. Hypophosphates are stable to alkali hydroxides. In fused sodium hydroxide they convert rapidly to the orthophosphate containing .

Polyhypophosphates
Polyhypophosphates are known containing linear anions, for example Na5P3O8 containing )3O5− with a P−P−P chain and Na6P4O10·2H2O containing )4O6−, with a P−P−P−P chain. The cyclic anion , (hypohexametaphosphate) where each phosphorus atom has an oxidation state of +3 is formed when a suspension of red phosphorus in KOH is oxidised with bromine.

See also 
Dithionic acid, the sulfur equivalent.

References

Mineral acids
Phosphorus oxoacids